Mount Hicks (also known as Saint David's Dome) is a mountain in the Southern Alps in Aoraki / Mount Cook National Park on the South Island of New Zealand. It is above the Hooker Glacier, in the vicinity of Aoraki / Mount Cook.

The mountain was first ascended in 1906. The starting point for ascents is the Empress hut. From the south face of Mount Hicks there are several possible routes, including the Dingle-Button route.

Notes

External links
  Image of Mount Hicks and Mount Cook, Mount Hicks is to the left of the middle in the background

Mountains of Canterbury, New Zealand
Three-thousanders